David Wedderburn (c.1580 – 23 October 1646) was a writer, and schoolmaster at Aberdeen Grammar School. Though his date of birth is not known, he was baptised on 2 January 1580, and was educated in Aberdeen.

He started working at Aberdeen Grammar School in April 1602. 

Wedderburn contributed a Latin poem for the celebrations to welcome James VI and I to Falkland Palace on 19 May 1617. This was the first royal visit to Scotland since 1603. In the poem the King, after a day of hunting, is asked to contemplate the memorials of Scotland's past, victories over the Romans and Vikings, the wars of Scottish Independence, and the present union of the kingdoms of Britain. The poem was presented again when some of the royal party visited Aberdeen, and the burgh corporation gave Wedderburn 50 merks.

He died in Aberdeen.

This was a Latin grammar, using sporting exemplars to help teach Latin.

The golf section was titled , a stick. Wedderburn believed that this was the derivation of the term golf as meaning 'club'. There were a number of other golf terms including the first clear mention of the golf hole.

 is also notable for an early reference to schoolboy football and contains a sentence to "keep goal".  The account was first published in 1938 by Francis Peabody Magoun, an American historian.  Magoun gives the original Latin text (see later) and his English translation:
"Let us choose sides
pick your man first
Those on our side come here
How many are against us?
Kick out the ball so that we may begin the game
Come, kick it here
You keep the goal
Snatch the ball from that fellow if you can
Come, throw yourself against him
Run at him
Kick the ball back
Well done. You aren't doing anything
To make a goal
This is the first goal, this the second, this the third
Drive that man back
The opponents are, moreover, coming out on top, If you don't look out, he will make a goal
Unless we play better, we'll be done for
Ah, victory is in your hands
Ha, hurrah. He is a very skilled ball player
Had it not been for him, we should have brought back the victory
Come, help me. We still have the better chance"

(The original Latin cited with minor corrections by Magoun (1938))

References

Scottish schoolteachers
17th-century Scottish writers
1646 deaths
Year of birth uncertain
People educated at Aberdeen Grammar School